Baiyun District is one of six urban districts of the prefecture-level city of Guiyang, the capital of Guizhou Province, China.

Climate

Economy 
The Guizhou subsidiary of Aluminum Corporation of China is headquartered in Baiyun District.

References 

County-level divisions of Guizhou
Guiyang